Nazlati Mohamed Andhumdine (born 20 December 1997) is a Comorian swimmer specializing in freestyle.

She made her international debut at the 2011 Pan Arab Games, competing in the 50 m freestyle on her 13th birthday where unfortunately she was disqualified. She was due to compete at the 2012 FINA World Swimming Championships (25 m) in Istanbul in the 50 m and 100 m freestyle and the 50 m breaststroke but withdrew. At the 2013 World Aquatics Championships she swan the 50 m freestyle in 38.45 s finishing 82nd and placed 73rd in the 100 m freestyle covering the distance in 1:33.88 s.

She competed for Comoros at the 2016 Summer Olympics in the 50m freestyle competition. She finished 86th overall in the heats with a time of 37.66 seconds and did not qualify for the semifinals. She was the flag bearer for Comoros during the Parade of Nations.

References

1997 births
Living people
Comorian female swimmers
Comorian female freestyle swimmers
Swimmers at the 2016 Summer Olympics
Olympic swimmers of the Comoros